The wXw Women's Championship is a title owned by German wrestling promotion Westside Xtreme Wrestling (wXw). The first champion was crowned on December 23, 2017. Killer Kelly defeated Melanie Gray in the finals of a tournament to become the inaugural champion. The current champion is Aliss Ink, who is in her first reign.

Title history 
Killer Kelly was the inaugural champion. Toni Storm has the most reigns at two. Amale's reign is the longest at 847 days, while Ava Everett and Killer Kelly reign are the shortest at 28 days.

Aliss Ink is the current champion in her first reign. She defeated Baby Allison on World Tag Team Festival - Night 2 on October 2, 2022, in Oberhausen, Nordrhein-Westfalen.

Combined reigns 

See also
wXw Unified World Wrestling Championship
wXw Shotgun Championship
wXw World Tag Team Championship

References

External links
 wXw Women's Championship History at Cagematch.net 

Westside Xtreme Wrestling championships
Women's professional wrestling championships